Statistics of First League of Bosnia and Herzegovina in the 1999–2000 season. It was contested only by Bosniak and Croatian clubs.  Serbian clubs played in the 1999–2000 First League of the Republika Srpska.

Overview
It was contested by 8 teams, and Brotnjo won the championship.

First round

First League of Football Association of Bosnia and Herzegovina

League standings

Results

First League of Herzeg-Bosnia

League standings

Play-offs

Group stage

Group A

Group B

Brotnjo - Jedinstvo Bihać 3–0
Jedinstvo Bihać - Brotnjo 3–1

Final

First leg

Second leg

Brotnjo 1–1 Budućnost Banovići on aggregate. Brotnjo won on away goals rule and qualified for 2000–01 UEFA Champions League (first qualifying round), while Budućnost qualified for 2000–01 UEFA Cup (qualifying round).

Intertoto Cup play-off 

Zrinjski was qualified for 2000 UEFA Intertoto Cup (first round).

See also
1999–2000 First League of the Republika Srpska

References 

 Bosnia-Herzegovina - List of final tables (RSSSF)

First League of Bosnia and Herzegovina seasons
1999–2000 in Bosnia and Herzegovina football
Bosnia